Davern L. Williams (born February 13, 1980) is a former American football defensive tackle in the National Football League for the Miami Dolphins and New York Giants, and a current defensive line coach. He played college football at Troy State University (now Troy University) and was drafted in the seventh round of the 2003 NFL Draft. Williams was the defensive line coach for East Mississippi Community College, and was featured in the first two seasons of the Netflix series Last Chance U. Williams is currently the defensive line coach at Troy University, his collegiate alma mater.

References

External links
Just Sports Stats
Murray State Racers bio
Tennessee-Chattanooga Bio

1980 births
American football defensive tackles
Auburn Tigers football players
Troy Trojans football players
Living people
New York Giants players
Miami Dolphins players
People from Brewton, Alabama
Huntingdon Hawks football coaches
Millsaps Majors football coaches
Murray State Racers football coaches
Jacksonville State Gamecocks football coaches
East Mississippi Lions football coaches
Chattanooga Mocs football coaches